Portal Mountain is a large mountain in Antarctica. The mountain has a broad ice-capped summit, and stands south of the Lashly Mountains, on the south side of the main stream of the Skelton Glacier where it leaves the polar plateau.

The mountain was discovered by the New Zealand party of the Commonwealth Trans-Antarctic Expedition (CTAE, 1956–58), who named it because of its association with The Portal.

References 

Mountains of Oates Land